Institute of Policy Studies may refer to

 Institute of Policy Studies (Pakistan) in Islamabad
 Institute of Policy Studies (Singapore)

See also

 Institute for Policy Studies in the United States